Target is a commune in the Allier department in Auvergne-Rhône-Alpes in central France.

Geography
The Venant, a tributary of the Bouble, forms all of the commune's northwestern border, then flows into the Bouble, which forms all of its southwestern border.

Population

See also
Communes of the Allier department

References

Communes of Allier
Allier communes articles needing translation from French Wikipedia